The Taiwan Balloons Museum is a museum about balloons in Anli Village, Shengang District, Taichung, Taiwan.

History
The museum building were once the old factory of the Taiwan Tailloon Balloons Co., Ltd. The current factory of the company is located right next to the museum building where the museum building is still owned and operated by the same company.

Architecture
The museum building resembles a balloon from outside.

Exhibitions
The museum exhibits the balloon production process, balloon making activities and balloon-related games.

Transportation
The museum is accessible west from Fengyuan Station of the Taiwan Railways.

See also
 List of museums in Taiwan

References

External links
  

Balloons (entertainment)
Industry museums in Taiwan
Museums in Taichung
Museums with year of establishment missing
Toy museums in Taiwan